Karl Becker may refer to:

Karl Becker (painter) (1820–1900), German painter
Karl Becker (philologist) (1775–1849), German physician and philologist
Karl Becker (statistician) (1823–1896), German statistician
Karl Heinrich Emil Becker (1879–1940), German engineer and officer
Karl Friedrich Becker (1777–1806), German historian
Karl Josef Becker (1928–2015), German Catholic theologian

See also
Karl-Heinz Becker (disambiguation)
Carl Becker (disambiguation)